Ray Township, Indiana may refer to one of the following places:

Ray Township, Franklin County, Indiana
Ray Township, Morgan County, Indiana

See also 

Ray Township (disambiguation)

Indiana township disambiguation pages